Andrej Kollár (born 12 January 1977) is a Slovak former professional ice hockey player.

Career 
Kollár played in the Slovak Extraliga for HK Poprad, HC Slovan Bratislava, HK 36 Skalica, HK Nitra and HK Dukla Trenčín. He also played in the Czech Extraliga for PSG Berani Zlín.

After retiring, he worked as general manager for Dukla Trenčín from 2011 to 2013.

Career statistics

References

External links

1977 births
Living people
HC Slovan Bratislava players
HK Dukla Trenčín players
HK Nitra players
HK Poprad players
HK 36 Skalica players
Slovak ice hockey forwards
PSG Berani Zlín players
Sportspeople from Topoľčany
Slovak expatriate ice hockey players in the Czech Republic